Sunscreem are a techno/house music band from Essex, England that scored a number of hits on the US Hot Dance Music/Club Play chart throughout the 1990s and into the 21st century. Sunscreem also has the rare reputation as a techno-based band that successfully performs concerts. Over a ten-year period, 12 of its singles made an entry to the UK Singles Chart.

Career
The nucleus of the group is lead vocalist/cellist/keyboardist Lucia Holm and fellow keyboardist Paul Carnell. The group has also, at times, included Darren Woodford, Rob Fricker, Sean Wright, Nick Slingsby (aka "Bongo Ted"), and DJ Dave Valentine.

Sunscreem released a 12" promo of "Love U More" on the Sony Soho Square record label in 1991, a song that went on to spend two weeks at No. 1 on the U.S. Dance chart in March 1993. The group also had club hits in the UK with the singles "Walk On" and "Pressure" (also on Sony Soho Square) before releasing its successful first album O3 on multiple labels in 1993. Other singles from O3 included "Perfect Motion" and a cover of the Marianne Faithfull song "Broken English".

"Love U More" was one of the first techno songs to hit the U.S. Billboard Hot 100 Top 40, climbing to No. 36 (to date it is their only Hot 100 entry). It was subsequently covered (usually in a bowdlerized form, omitting the climactic reference to rape and toning down other images in the lyrics) by other artists including Paul Elstak, LMP, Rollergirl, and Steps.

The band is known for having its songs remixed by a wide variety of dance music producers, including Leftfield, Band of Gypsies, Carl Cox, Push, Rollo Armstrong from Faithless, Red Jerry, Matt Darey, Slam, X-Press 2, Trouser Enthusiasts, Robbie Rivera, Jimmy Gomez, K-Klass, Armand Van Helden, and Fire Island (Pete Heller and Terry Farley) among others.

Ahead of its second album, the group released a variety of tracks under alternative names, including a selection of 12-inch singles referred to as the Anna Series. This included the instrumental "Angel Dub," which was credited to Anna Din, and was featured on many compilations, such as Renaissance: The Mix Collection by Sasha & John Digweed. These tracks were released independently, breaking the terms of their contract with Sony, and leading to an increasingly strained relationship with the label.

The group's second album was called Change or Die, and from it, the band released the singles "When" (U.S. Dance No. 1), "Exodus," "White Skies," "Secrets," and "Looking at You" (U.S. Dance No. 2). Despite all these singles, the album was not commercially released in major territories outside the UK, and the band therefore negotiated its release from its Sony Music contract. Their next release was a mainly instrumental limited-edition CD called New Dark Times, issued on the band's own Kali label, which combined new material with tracks from the Anna Series and remixes from Change or Die.

The band subsequently signed with UK dance label Pulse-8. Its next single, "Catch" (U.K. Dance No. 1, U.S. Dance No. 2), was from an album titled Out of the Woods, but the label went bankrupt in 1997 before its completion, along with some other challenges at the time this meant that the album and the second single "Cover Me" were never released on the Pulse-8 label; though remixes of "Cover Me" by Trouser Enthusiasts appeared on compilations, and an unfinished version of the album was leaked online.

Since then, there have been a handful of releases and compilations such as the Sunscreem vs Push "Please Save Me" single (US Dance No. 26, UK Singles No. 40), and a re-release of "Perfect Motion" with new remixes by Starchaser and Way out West. In 2002, the group released Ten Mile Bank, which combined new and remixed material in the manner of New Dark Times, many of the tracks being club mixes of songs from the as yet unissued Out of the Woods. Lead singer Lucia Holm released a promo called "Heaven" (a cover of the Psychedelic Furs song) to radio stations in 2005, but it was never fully published as a 'solo' work. The track is instead featured on Out of the Woods as a Sunscreem work.

In May 2015, Sunscreem played at a series of local events to promote their album "Sweet Life", which was released on iTunes.

In 2018, the band continued to perform live and this built up to Out of the Woods finally being released through the Annalogic label in November 2018.

Discography

Albums

Singles

Under aliases
Anna Din: "Angel" / "Angel Dub" (1994)
Anna Crusis: "XS" / "Syclik" (1994)
Anna Nas: Untitled (1994)
Chiba: "Time Flies" (1997)
DJ AWOL: "Absent"  (2002)

The "Anna series" were issued on 12" only. Variants of these tracks were subsequently issued (some under different titles) on Change or Die, New Dark Times and the "Exodus" single. "Time Flies" was an extended version of "A Brief History of Nonsense" from New Dark Times, itself a radical remix of "Exodus".

In addition, DJs Darren Tate and Judge Jules had a hit in 2000 with "It's My Turn" credited to Angelic, which was their previously-issued remix of Sunscreem's "Change" with the original vocal track replaced with a new one by Jules' wife Amanda O'Riordan. The track reached number 11 in the UK singles chart.

See also
List of number-one dance hits (United States)
List of artists who reached number one on the US Dance chart

References

External links
Official website
 

English dance music groups
English electronic music groups
English house music groups
English techno music groups
British trance music groups
Musical groups from Essex
Columbia Records artists
Hardcore techno music groups
Musical groups established in 1991
1991 establishments in England